Brabant Island is the second largest island of the Palmer Archipelago within the British Antarctic Territory, lying between Anvers Island and Liège Island. The interior of the island is occupied by two mountain ranges, Solvay Mountains (Cook Summit, 1590 m) in its southern part and Stribog Mountains (summit Mount Parry) in its central and northern parts.

It was named by the Belgian Antarctic Expedition (1897–1899) under Adrien de Gerlache, who named it after the Belgian Province of Brabant, in recognition of the support given to the expedition by its citizens.

A paper summarizing the Joint Services expedition of 1984–1985 describes the island as "notoriously inhospitable" and states that there is evidence for only six visits between the discovery in 1898 and 1984.  Members of the expedition overwintered there in 1984–1985, and made the first ascent of Mount Parry.

Geology
The Brabant Island Tectonic Block includes up to 2000 m of basaltic-andesitic lavas and volcaniclastics, possibly corresponding to the Lower Cretaceous Antarctic Peninsula Volcanic Group of the Danco Coast.  This group is intruded by a granodiorite sill and Early Eocene hypabyssal dykes.  Late Tertiary to Pleistocene basaltic lavas uncomformably overlay this complex.

Maps
 Antarctic Digital Database (ADD). Scale 1:250000 topographic map of Antarctica. Scientific Committee on Antarctic Research (SCAR). Since 1993, regularly upgraded and updated.
British Antarctic Territory. Scale 1:200000 topographic map. DOS 610 Series, Sheet W 64 62. Directorate of Overseas Surveys, Tolworth, UK, 1980.
Brabant Island to Argentine Islands. Scale 1:250000 topographic map. British Antarctic Survey, 2008.

Gallery

See also 
 Gerlache Strait Geology
 Composite Antarctic Gazetteer
 List of Antarctic and sub-Antarctic islands
 List of Antarctic islands south of 60° S
 SCAR
 Territorial claims in Antarctica

Further reading 
 John Kimbrey, Joint Services Expedition to Brabant Island, Antarctica, P 179
 Jim D Hansom, C.P. Flint, Holocene ice fluctuations on Brabant Island, Antarctic Peninsula, Antarctic Science 1 (2), PP 165 – 166
 Damien Gildea, Antarctic Peninsula - Mountaineering in Antarctica: Travel Guide
 William James Mills, Exploring Polar Frontiers: A Historical Encyclopedia, P 99

References

External links 
 Map of the area
 U.S. Geological Survey, Atlas of Antarctic Research
  Brazilian Antarctic Program
 Brabant Island on AADC website
 Brabant Island on NASA website
 current weather on Brabant Island
 long term updated weather for Brabant Island
 weather statistics for Brabant Island
 

 
Islands of the Palmer Archipelago